The Stonehaven neighborhood of Charlotte, North Carolina was established in the 1950s. In addition to the Stonehaven subdivision, the area also includes the Olde Stonehaven, Queens Grant, Rama Woods, Waverly Hall and Medearis subdivisions. The neighborhood is bounded by Rama Road to the northwest, Sardis Road to the southwest, McAlpine Creek to the southeast and a railroad track and Monroe Road to the northeast. The area is neighbored by the areas known as Sherwood Forest, Landsdowne, McClintock Woods, and Sardis Woods. The area's dominant architectural style is the ranch-style house with brick or wood exterior.

Education
The neighborhood's public schools are served by Charlotte-Mecklenburg Schools. The neighborhood is zoned for East Mecklenburg High School, McClintock Middle School and Rama Road Elementary. The neighborhood is also home to two private schools, Charlotte Christian School and Charlotte Preparatory School. Providence Day School is located just across Sardis Rd. from the neighborhood.

External links
 Stonehaven Community Association
 Stonehaven Neighborhood Data

Neighborhoods in Charlotte, North Carolina
Populated places established in the 1950s